The 2020 Czech Athletics Championships was the 28th edition of the national outdoor track and field championships for the Czech Republic. It took place from 8–9 August at Atletický stadion města Plzně in Plzeň, organized by the local club AK Škoda Plzeň.

Results

Men

Women

References

Results
 Mistrovství ČR mužů a žen na dráze Plzeň (8. - 9. 8. 2020). atletika.cz. Retrieved 2021-03-18.

External links
 Czech Athletics Federation website

Czech Athletics Championships
Czech Athletics Championships
Czech Athletics Championships
Czech Athletics Championships
Sport in Plzeň